James Willie of Washington, Wilkes County, Georgia, (5 Jan 1823-1863) was a Texas lawyer, legislator, and attorney general. In 1846, he was elected to represent Washington County in the first Legislature of Texas. He was the principal author of the Texas Penal Code of 1856. He was elected Attorney General of Texas in 1856. He died in Houston in 1863. He was married to Sallie Johnson.

References

1823 births
1863 deaths
Texas Attorneys General
People from Washington, Georgia